Artur Becker (12 May 1905, Remscheid – 16 May 1938, Burgos) was a German communist and functionary of the Young Communist League of Germany (KJVD), as well as a participant in the Spanish Civil War.

Biography 
Born into a working-class family, Becker's father was active in the Independent Social Democratic Party (USPD). After graduating from elementary school in Remscheid, Becker was trained as a locksmith and lathe operator.  As a youth, he joined the Free Socialist Youth in 1919, the Young Communist League (KJVD) in 1920, and the Communist Party (KPD) in 1922.

During the occupation of the Ruhr area in 1923 he was involved in active resistance.

From 1926 he worked as a politician, first as leader of the communist youth on the Lower Rhine from 1926 to 1928, from 1928 as a member of the executive committee of the Communist Youth International, and from 1931 to 1932 as chairman of the central committee of the KJVD. In 1930 he was elected to the Reichstag on the Reich election proposal of the KPD. In the Reichstag elections in July and November 1932, as well as in March 1933, he was elected as one of the deputies for constituency 23 ( Düsseldorf-West) elected. Since the mandates of the KPD in the parliament elected in 1933 were canceled before the constituent session, Becker was a member of the Reichstag from October 1930 to January 1933. He was the youngest member of the house.

As a political opponent of Nazism, he was forced to emigrate in 1933 and fled to Moscow.

He later was an international organizer for the defense of the Spanish Republic. From August 1937 he took part in the armed struggles, from the spring of 1938 as Political Commissar of the Thälmann Battalion of the International Brigades.

On April 13, 1938, he was severely wounded and taken prisoner by the Falangists. After several weeks of interrogation and torture, he is said to have been shot dead in a Burgos prison on May 16, 1938, although the exact date of his killing is not certain. According to a Gestapo report from August 1939, their officials were in Spain interrogating prisoners and also trying to find Becker.

Legacy 
After the end of World War II, Artur Becker received extensive honors in East Germany. Streets, schools, and industrial plants, for example, the youth power plant "Artur Becker" Trattendorf , and the officers' college of the Ministry of the Interior were named after him. Since 1960,  Freie Deutsche Jugend has been awarding the Artur Becker Medal in gold, silver, and bronze for outstanding achievements in the "socialist youth association".

After German reunification, most objects and streets named after Becker were largely renamed. However, there are still some streets and schools that bear his name.

In Berlin, one of the 96 memorial plaques for the members of the Reichstag murdered by the Nazi regime has commemorated Artur Becker since 1992. In September 2021, a memorial plaque was unveiled on Becker's former home at Schlichtallee 1 in Rummelsburg.

References

1905 births
1938 deaths
German communists
Communist Party of Germany politicians
German people of the Spanish Civil War
International Brigades personnel
German anti-fascists
German Comintern people
German emigrants to the Soviet Union
Members of the Reichstag of the Weimar Republic